Pond are a psychedelic rock band from Perth, Western Australia, formed in 2008. Initially featuring a revolving line-up, since 2016 the band has consisted of Nick Allbrook, Jay Watson, Shiny Joe Ryan, Jamie Terry, and James Ireland.

Pond is often heavily associated with fellow Perth-based psychedelic rock/pop band Tame Impala, as members of both groups are longtime close friends and collaborators. Watson is currently a full-time member of both acts. Lead singer Allbrook contributed to both bands from 2009 to 2013 before leaving Tame Impala to focus on Pond and his own solo career. Multi-instrumentalists Ryan and Ireland serve as crew members for Tame Impala's live act. In addition, current Tame Impala members Kevin Parker, Cam Avery, and Julien Barbagallo are all former members of Pond. Parker continued to work with the band as its record producer until 2020, and Avery collaborated with Allbrook as the duo Allbrook/Avery. Watson and Ireland sometimes collaborate under the name GUM & Ginoli, remixing songs originally recorded by other artists.

As of 2022, Pond has released nine studio albums and one live album.

History
Pond were formed in Perth, Western Australia, in 2008 with members Nick Allbrook, Jay Watson and Joe Ryan. The original idea of Pond was to be able to get anyone they wanted to play whatever they wanted in a collaborative musical project.

Their first album was released soon after in January 2009, titled Psychedelic Mango which contained many psychedelic rock and pop elements. Their second album, Corridors of Blissterday, was completed live with an eight piece band in five days, and released in June 2009. This led to the creation of their 2010 album, Frond, released in May 2010, featuring a heavier pop influence than previously heard from them.

After the breakthrough success of Innerspeaker, the debut album by Tame Impala, a band which shares three members with Pond, the album Beard, Wives, Denim was recorded in 2010 and later released to critical acclaim in March 2012.

Pond toured the United States in 2012, appearing at festivals such as South by Southwest, with another album titled Hobo Rocket set for release in the future. On 26 May 2012, NME magazine named Pond "The Hottest New Band In The World" in their "Hot List" issue. On 28 June 2012, Pond had a one-off performance with Can frontman Damo Suzuki, one of Pond's biggest inspirations and musical idols.

Originally, Man It Feels Like Space Again was planned to be the next Pond album, but instead Hobo Rocket was chosen to be recorded beforehand and was released on 6 August 2013. Pond described Hobo Rocket as being "much better" than Beard, Wives, Denim. Man It Feels Like Space Again, their sixth studio album, was later released on 23 January 2015.

Pond announced their seventh album The Weather, released on 7 May 2017 via Marathon Artists. The announcement came with the release of two singles, "30000 Megatons" and "Sweep Me Off My Feet". The title and chorus of the first song refer to the 30,000 nuclear warheads in the arsenal of the Earth. As with their previous album, The Weather was produced by Kevin Parker at his studio in Perth. The album was preceded by the release of two more singles, "The Weather" and "Paint Me Silver". The album was released to critical acclaim, with many publications praising it as an evolution and maturation of the band's sound and songwriting.

A little over a year after the release of The Weather, on 23 July 2018, Pond released the single "Burnt Out Star" and announced tour dates. The band then released the single "Sixteen Days" on 5 October along with an accompanying music video. The single "Daisy" was released on 10 January 2019 with a music video that was filmed on land for which the Kulin and Nyoongar Nations were the traditional custodians, with the band paying respect to them in the opening card. Along with the release of this single, the band announced through social media their eighth studio album, Tasmania, which was released through Interscope Records on 1 March 2019 to similar acclaim as The Weather.

Days after the release of Tasmania, the band toured locally, with performances in Perth, Brisbane, Sydney, and Melbourne. It would be their first local tour since 2017. Later that year they would go on to tour Europe and the UK.

On 9 September 2019, the band announced a live album, Sessions, which was released on 8 November 2019. To promote it they released the single "Don't Look at the Sun (Or You'll Go Blind)", an updated live version of a song featured on their debut album Psychedelic Mango.

During a live performance in Perth, Australia on 8 November 2020, the band unveiled a song titled "America's Cup" and hinted that their ninth studio album was set to be released in June 2021. On 31 March 2021, the band released a single called "Pink Lunettes", which was accompanied by a music video directed by band member Jamie Terry. On 17 May 2021, the band revealed that their ninth studio album, 9, would be released on 1 October 2021, along with a single, "America's Cup". On 30 June 2021, the album's third single, "Toast", was released alongside a video that was co-directed by the band. On 1 September 2021, the album's fourth single, "Human Touch", was released and accompanied by a video co-directed by Duncan Wright and lead singer Nick Allbrook. On 17 November 2021, the band released a video for the album track, "Take Me Avalon I'm Young", filmed in Hastings, UK, and directed by Bunny Kinney.

Band members

Current
 Nick Allbrook – vocals, flute, keys, synth, guitar, bass, slide guitar, occasional drums, production (2008–present)
 "Shiny" Joe Ryan – vocals, guitar, bass, 12-string guitar, slide guitar, occasional synth, production (2008–present)
 Jay "Gum" Watson – drums, vocals, bass, guitar, keys, synth, production and mixing (2008–present)
 Jamie Terry – keys, synth, organ, bass, occasional guitar, production (2008–present)
 James "Gin" Ireland – drums, occasional keys, production, and mixing (2016–present)

Contributors and occasional/former members
 Kevin Parker – drums (2009–2011), production and mixing (2012–2019)
 Nick Odell – congas
 Richard Ingham – synth, table
 Felicity Groom - saw
 Matthew Saville – drums (2009)
 Julien Barbagallo – bass (2014–2015)
 Cam Avery – drums, bass (2012–2014)
 Ben McDonald – bass (2014)

Timeline

Discography

Studio albums

Live albums

EPs

Singles

Awards and nominations

AIR Awards
The Australian Independent Record Awards (commonly known informally as AIR Awards) is an annual awards night to recognise, promote and celebrate the success of Australia's Independent Music sector.

|-
| AIR Awards of 2020
| Tasmania
| Best Independent Rock Album or EP
| 
|-

APRA Awards
The APRA Awards are held in Australia and New Zealand by the Australasian Performing Right Association to recognise songwriting skills, sales and airplay performance by its members annually.

! 
|-
| 2016
| "Zond"
| Song of the Year
| 
| 
|-

EG Awards / Music Victoria Awards
The EG Awards (known as Music Victoria Awards since 2013) are an annual awards night celebrating Victorian music. They commenced in 2006.

|-
|rowspan="2"| EG Awards of 2012
| Beard, Wives, Denim
| Best Album
| 
|-
| Pond
| Best Band
| 
|-

West Australian Music Industry Awards
The West Australian Music Industry Awards (WAMIs) are annual awards presented to the local contemporary music industry, put on annually by the Western Australian Music Industry Association Inc (WAM). Pond has won two awards.
 
 (wins only)
|-
| rowspan="2"| 2014
| rowspan="2"| Pond
| Most Popular Act
| 
|-
| Most Popular Live Act
| 
|-

References

External links

Info at SpinningTop

Musical groups from Perth, Western Australia
Musical groups established in 2008
Australian psychedelic rock music groups
Australian indie rock groups
Fiction Records artists